was a Japanese marine biologist, ichthyologist, and herpetologist.

Born Kiyomatsu Sakamoto in Hyogo Prefecture, Kiyomatsu Matsubara was the first professor of the Department of Fisheries of the University of Kyoto and is considered to be the founder of Japanese research on fish systematics. He changed his name to "Matsubara" in the early 1930s. He has focused his research primarily on the scorpionfish (Scorpaeniformes) and published many books and scholarly articles. He described several new species of fish, including the crocodile shark (Pseudocarcharias kamoharai).

Species named after him include the rays Bathyraja matsubarai (Ishiyama, 1952) and Dasyatis matsubarai Miyosi, 1939.

See also
 :Category:Taxa named by Kiyomatsu Matsubara

References 

Japanese ichthyologists
Japanese herpetologists
Japanese marine biologists
1907 births
1968 deaths
20th-century Japanese zoologists